The Syracuse Jazz Festival was an annual free admission outdoor summer music festival staged in Syracuse, New York. It was founded by jazz presenter Frank Malfitano and ran from 1982 to 2017.

Recognition 
 

Syracuse Jazz Fest was praised by the International Association for Jazz Education (IAJE), and previously ranked as the Central New York Region's "Best Music Festival". Syracuse Jazz Fest and was ranked as "One of the top five free jazz festivals in America". (Fest Press: A Guide To US Music Festivals) Referred to by Down Beat and Jazz Times Magazines as "The Northeast's Largest Free Jazz Festival".

History 
Aretha Franklin headlined the 2015 festival, which also featured Lake Street Dive,  Wynton Marsalis & The Jazz At Lincoln Center Orchestra and Buckwheat Zydeco. 

Other artists and headliners who appeared and performed at Syracuse Jazz Fest include: Dizzy Gillespie, Ray Charles, Dave Brubeck, Sonny Rollins, Natalie Cole, Chaka Khan, Smokey Robinson, Gino Vannelli, Blood Sweat & Tears, Chuck Mangione, David Sanborn, Roberta Flack, Dionne Warwick, Diana Krall, Grover Washington Jr., Boz Scaggs, Trombone Shorty & Orleans Avenue, The Neville Brothers, Pete Fountain, Mark Murphy, Dr John, Little Jimmy Scott, Gregory Porter, Donovan, The Doobie Brothers, Ronnie Laws, Average White Band, Chico Hamilton, Fathead Newman, The Preservation Hall Jazz Band, Mose Allison, Les McCann, The Funk Brothers, Pat Metheny Group, Return to Forever, George Benson, Al Jarreau, Ivan Lins, Freddy Cole, New York Voices, Treme Brass Band, Larry Coryell, John McLaughlin, Manhattan Transfer, Kenny G, Lizz Wright, Cyrille Aimee, Jane Monheit, Yellowjackets, Jaco Pastorius Big band, Nancy Kelly, Brubeck Brothers, Count Basie Orchestra, Moscow State Jazz Orchestra, Bela Fleck & The Flecktones and The Brecker Brothers.

2016 
Frank Malfitano received a national "Jazz Hero Award" from the Jazz Journalists Association presented by JJA's Susan Brink.

Featured artists included Michael McDonald, Trombone Shorty & Orleans Avenue, Larry Coryell's Original Eleventh House, Raul Malo & The Mavericks, and a Jazz Fest All Star Tribute to legendary jazz vocalist Mark Murphy, featuring appearances by New York Voices, Randy Brecker and Nancy Kelly.

References

External links

Jazz festivals in New York (state)
Culture of Syracuse, New York